Pelekanos is a former municipality in the Chania regional unit, Crete, Greece. Since the 2011 local government reform it is part of the municipality Kantanos-Selino, of which it is a municipal unit. Pelekanos is in the south west corner of the island, part of the rugged and remote Selino Province. The Venetians built a castle - Kastel Selinou - at Palaiochora, giving the region its name. Palaiochora is now a growing coastal resort and the capital town of the municipality.

There are 35 villages in Pelekanos including:
Palaiochora
Prodromi
Koundoura
Anidri
Voutas
Sklavopoula
Sarakina

See also
List of settlements in the Chania regional unit

References

Populated places in Chania (regional unit)